Choteau is a city in and the county seat of Teton County, Montana, United States. The population was 1,721 at the 2020 census.

The Montana town is named for French fur merchant, trader and explorer Pierre Chouteau, Jr., who is also the namesake of Chouteau County, Montana (county seat: Fort Benton). Fort Pierre, South Dakota and Pierre, South Dakota are also named after Pierre Chouteau, Jr. Originally a trading post established by A. B. Hamilton in 1873, the town was platted in 1883.

Geography
The Teton River runs nearby, although for some distance upstream of Choteau, it is dry during much of the year.

U.S. Route 89 and 287 converge in town. It is near Freezout Lake.

Demographics

2010 census
As of the census of 2010, there were 1,684 people, 791 households, and 441 families residing in the city. The racial makeup of the city was 95.0% White, 2.1% Native American, 0.2% Asian, 0.1% Pacific Islander, 0.3% from other races, and 2.3% from two or more races. Hispanic or Latino of any race were 1.7% of the population.

There were 791 households, of which 21.9% had children under the age of 18 living with them, 45.8% were married couples living together, 6.8% had a female householder with no husband present, 3.2% had a male householder with no wife present, and 44.2% were non-families. 39.6% of all households were made up of individuals, and 20% had someone living alone who was 65 years of age or older. The average household size was 2.04 and the average family size was 2.75.

The median age in the city was 49.1 years. 19.5% of residents were under the age of 18; 5.1% were between the ages of 18 and 24; 19.8% were from 25 to 44; 29.8% were from 45 to 64; and 25.8% were 65 years of age or older. The gender makeup of the city was 46.4% male and 53.6% female.

2000 census
As of the census of 2000, there were 1,781 people, 807 households, and 464 families residing in the city. The population density was 994.3 people per square mile (/km2). There were 897 housing units at an average density of 500.8 per square mile (/km2). The racial makeup of the city was 93.94% White, 0.06% African American, 2.92% Native American, 0.11% Asian, 0.22% from other races, and 2.75% from two or more races. Hispanic or Latino of any race were 1.18% of the population.

There were 807 households, out of which 24.9% had children under the age of 18 living with them, 46.8% were married couples living together, 8.6% had a female householder with no husband present, and 42.4% were non-families. 39.2% of all households were made up of individuals, and 21.9% had someone living alone who was 65 years of age or older. The average household size was 2.13 and the average family size was 2.82.

In the city, the population was spread out, with 22.7% under the age of 18, 4.4% from 18 to 24, 21.4% from 25 to 44, 25.8% from 45 to 64, and 25.7% who were 65 years of age or older. The median age was 46 years. For every 100 females there ware 86.3 males. For every 100 females age 18 and over, there were 80.9 males.

The median income for a household in the city was $25,708, and the median income for a family was $35,655. Males had a median income of $22,429 versus $17,098 for females. The per capita income for the city was $14,999. About 12.7% of families and 17.6% of the population were below the poverty line, including 30.2% of those under the age of 18 and 12.5% of those 65 and older.

Government
Choteau's mayor is Chris Hindoien.

City Council
City of Choteau is split into two wards. The current City Council is composed of Sara Coccoli and Steve Howard in Ward 1, and Stewart Merja and Steven Dogiakos in Ward 2.

In the news
Choteau has made national news in the U.S. because it is the town nearest to a  ranch that David Letterman purchased in 1999 as a vacation home. Letterman has talked about the ranch on his late-night show and showed photos of a black bear invading the place in September 2003.

On his first show after the attacks of September 11, 2001, Letterman gave an impassioned monologue about New York City in the aftermath. He concluded his seven-minute speech by mentioning Choteau's rally to raise money for victims of the attacks, despite the long drought there, as an example of the spirit of the United States.

On March 19, 2009, Letterman married his girlfriend of 23 years at the Teton County Courthouse in Choteau.

In 2008, school authorities in Choteau made national news headlines by canceling a speaking engagement by Nobel laureate climate researcher Steve Running, who was scheduled to speak to local high school students.

Climate
Choteau experiences a semi-arid climate (Köppen BSk) with cold, dry winters and warm, more humid summers.

Notable people

 John Edward Erickson, Governor of Montana, was born in Stoughton.
 J. Frank Glendon, actor
 A. B. Guthrie Jr., American novelist
 David Letterman, late-night talk show host
 Jay Neitz, vision scientist
 J. K. Ralston, western painter
 Flint Rasmussen, rodeo clown
 Jim Waltermire, Montana Secretary of State
 Jesse R. Gleason, western artist

Dinosaurs
Choteau is near one of the most important paleontology sites in the world, Egg Mountain.  The Old Trail Museum in Choteau is home to the Maiasaura type fossil, which is the Montana State Fossil.  The 3-D display can be viewed during the summer operating season.  Also showcased is the Egg Mountain find along with a commentary on the significance to the paleontology world.

Infrastructure
Choteau Airport is a public use airport located one mile (2 km) northeast of town.

Education
Choteau Public Schools serves all grades of children in the community. Choteau High School received a 2009 Best High School Bronze Award recognition from U.S. News & World Report for its excellence in education. They are known as the Bulldogs.

The elementary school has 214 students in grades K-8 while the high school has 113 students in grades 9–12.

Choteau/Teton Public Library serves the area.

References

External links

 Choteau Chamber of Commerce website
 Choteau Acantha
 Choteau Public Schools

Cities in Teton County, Montana
County seats in Montana
Cities in Montana